Bacchides may refer to:

 Bacchides (play), a Roman comedy by the playwright Plautus
 Bacchides (general), Hellenistic Greek general, ruler of country beyond Euphrates